The men's pole vault event at the 2015 European Athletics U23 Championships was held in Tallinn, Estonia, at Kadriorg Stadium on 9 and 11 July.

Medalists

Results

Final
11 July

Qualifications
9 July

Participation
According to an unofficial count, 21 athletes from 17 countries participated in the event.

References

Pole vault
Pole vault at the European Athletics U23 Championships